The following is a list of the states of Nigeria ranked by the highest point in elevation.

List

Highest point
Nigeria